Boxer is the fourth studio album by American indie rock band The National, released on May 22, 2007 on Beggars Banquet Records. Following its release, the album debuted at number 68 on the U.S. Billboard 200, selling about 9,500 copies in its first week.

A documentary film, titled A Skin, A Night, was released the following year. Focusing on the recording process of Boxer, the film was directed by independent filmmaker Vincent Moon, and released in conjunction with a collection of b-sides, demos and live recordings, titled The Virginia EP, on May 20, 2008.

Background and recording
The band recorded Boxer with producer Peter Katis, with vocalist Matt Berninger stating, "We recorded a lot of it at home. Probably half and half of home recording and recording with Peter in the studio. We always kind of work that way, going in and out of studios and then back home. We have little home set-ups. He has been a big part of the band for awhile, at least in the recording of the records. He kind of jumps in as a seventh member."

Singer-songwriter and multi-instrumentalist Sufjan Stevens appears on the tracks, "Racing Like a Pro" and "Ada". Regarding his recording contributions, Berninger noted, "Bryce has played a lot with [Sufjan’s] touring band, so Bryce knows him really well. And [Sufjan] lives in the same neighborhood that Bryce and Aaron live in. They just called him and he came over for a day. It was a one-day collaboration. Him, Bryce and Aaron hang out a lot and make little songs together, so it was really a kind of casual type of collaboration."

Writing and composition
The track "Slow Show" contains lyrics from the band's song "29 Years", which previously appeared on their self-titled debut album.

Artwork
The album cover is a photo of the band performing the tracks "The Geese of Beverly Road" and "Daughters of the Soho Riots" from the band's previous album, Alligator (2005), at producer Peter Katis's wedding.

Promotion
The National made their television debut on July 24, 2007, performing "Fake Empire" on the Late Show with David Letterman. The band later performed "Apartment Story" on The Late Late Show with Craig Ferguson on September 26, 2007.

Reception

Boxer received widespread acclaim from music critics. In the year-end issue of Paste the album was named the best record of 2007. "Mistaken for Strangers" was number 92 on Rolling Stones list of "The 100 Best Songs of 2007". Popular internet publication Pitchfork ranked the album number 17 in their annual end-of-the-year "Top 50 Albums of 2007" list, as well as on Stylus Magazine'''s "Top 50 Albums of 2007" list at number 5.   Stylus also ranked "Fake Empire" at number 7 on their "Top 50 Songs of 2007" list. Boxer also garnered the top position on WOXY.com's "97 Best of 2007".Boxer has made numerous "albums of the decade" lists including Pitchfork, Aquarium Drunkard, and Paste. In 2019, the album was ranked 68th on The Guardians 100 Best Albums of the 21st Century list.

Track listing

PersonnelThe National Matt Berninger – lead vocals
 Aaron Dessner – guitar, backing vocals, keyboards, piano, percussion
 Bryce Dessner – guitar, piano
 Scott Devendorf – bass, backing vocals
 Bryan Devendorf – drums, percussionAdditional personnel Produced by Peter Katis and The National
 Additional production by Aaron Dessner
 Recorded and mixed by Peter Katis at Tarquin Studios, Bridgeport, Connecticut
 Second engineer: Greg Georgio; assisted by Nathan Curry and Cory Foley-Marsello
 Home recording by The National and Brandon Reid in Brooklyn, New York and White Sulphur Springs, West Virginia
 Additional recording by Greg Georgio and Josh Clark at The Seaside Lounge, and Bennett Paster at Benny's Wash n' Dry, Brooklyn
 Mastered by Fred Kevorkian at Kevorkian Mastering, New York, New York
 Orchestration by Padma Newsome
 Additional arrangements by Bryce Dessner and Aaron Dessner
 Cover photo by Abbey Drucker
 Interior photos by Clara Claus
 Design by Distant Station Ltd.Additional musicians' Tim Albright – trombone
 Thomas Bartlett – keyboards, accordion
 Carin Besser – vocals on "Apartment Story"
 CJ Camerieri – trumpet
 Rachael Elliott – bassoon
 Pauline de Lassus – vocals
 Marla Hansen – vocals
 Ha-Yang Kim – cello
 Padma Newsome – viola, violin, organ
 Sara Phillips – clarinet
 Alex Sopp – flute
 Sufjan Stevens – piano on "Racing Like a Pro" and "Ada"
 Jeb Wallace – French horn

Charts

Certifications

 33⅓ Book 
In April 2022, Boxer became the subject of an entry in the 33⅓ book series (#162) released by Bloomsbury Publishing. Authored by Ryan Pinkard, the oral history chronicles the band's first years leading up to the recording and release of Boxer'', and features extensive original interviews with The National, Peter Katis, Carin Besser, and numerous others involved in the album.

References

2007 albums
The National (band) albums
Beggars Banquet Records albums
Albums produced by Peter Katis
Albums produced by Aaron Dessner